The 1999–2000 Iowa State Cyclones men's basketball team represents Iowa State University during the 1999–2000 NCAA Division I men's basketball season. The Cyclones were coached by Larry Eustachy, who was in his 2nd season. They played their home games at Hilton Coliseum in Ames, Iowa and competed in the Big 12 Conference. The captains were Stevie Johnson and Michael Nurse.

They finished the season 32–5, 14–2 in Big 12 play to win the regular season conference title. They defeated Baylor, Oklahoma State, and Oklahoma to win the Big 12 Conference tournament and earn an automatic bid to the NCAA tournament.  They defeated Central Connecticut, Auburn, and UCLA to reach the Elite Eight where they lost to Michigan State.

Previous season

The previous season they finished the season 15–15, 6–10 in Big 12 play to finish in 9th place.  They lost to Colorado in the first round of the Big 12 Conference tournament.

Offseason departures
In the offseason associate head coach Steve Barnes left to become the Head Coach of the San Jose State Spartans.

In the spring of 1999 Rodney Hampton was arrested for disorderly conduct by the Ames Police.  Shortly after head coach Larry Eustachy dismissed him for violating team rules.

While red-shirting the 1998-99 season Travis Spivey was arrested for simple assault in season and was suspended from the team, after the charges were dropped he was reinstated.  Then later that year in the summer he was charged with sexual assault and was immediately dismissed from the team.

Shortly after graduation Tony Rampton would go on to represent his home country of New Zealand on their national team, the New Zealand Tall Blacks.

Preseason

The preseason Big 12 Coaches' Poll picked Iowa State to finish sixth in the conference.  Marcus Fizer was also named to the Preseason Top 50 by the Wooden Award Committee as well as Preseason All-Big 12 first team.

Preseason Poll

Incoming Players

Regular season
On November 23, 1999, Iowa State didn't receive any votes in the USA Today/ESPN Top 25 coaches poll. They also were ranked T–47th in the AP Top 25 poll with 2 points. From November 26 – November 28 the Cyclones participated in the Big Island Invitational at Hilo Hawai'i. From December 3 – December 4 the Cyclones hosted the Norwest Cyclone Challenge. From December 21 – December 22 the Cyclones hosted the Tribune Holiday Classic. On December 14, 1999, Iowa State didn't receive any votes in the USA Today/ESPN Top 25 coaches poll. They also were ranked T–47th in the AP Top 25 poll with 1 point. On December 21, 1999, Iowa State didn't receive any votes in the USA Today/ESPN Top 25 coaches poll. They also were ranked T–46th in the AP Top 25 poll with 1 point. On December 28, 1999, Iowa State didn't receive any votes in the USA Today/ESPN Top 25 coaches poll. They also were ranked T–39th in the AP Top 25 poll with 6 points. On January 4, 2000, Iowa State didn't receive any votes in the USA Today/ESPN Top 25 coaches poll. They also were ranked T–39th in the AP Top 25 poll with 6 points. On January 11, 2000, Iowa State received 1 point in the USA Today/ESPN Top 25 coaches poll which had them ranked T–47th. They also were ranked 30th in the AP Top 25 poll with 26 points. On January 18, 2000, Iowa State received 6 points in the USA Today/ESPN Top 25 coaches poll which had them ranked T–39th. They also were ranked 29th in the AP Top 25 poll with 56 points. On January 25, 2000, Iowa State received 20 points in the USA Today/ESPN Top 25 coaches poll which had them ranked 29th. They also were ranked 28th in the AP Top 25 poll with 49 points. On February 1, 2000, Iowa State received 76 points in the USA Today/ESPN Top 25 coaches poll which had them ranked 24th. They also were ranked 20th in the AP Top 25 poll with 331 points. On February 8, 2000, Iowa State received 115 points in the USA Today/ESPN Top 25 coaches poll which had them ranked 21st. They also were ranked 17th in the AP Top 25 poll with 519 points. On February 15, 2000, Iowa State received 277 points in the USA Today/ESPN Top 25 coaches poll which had them ranked 17th. They also were ranked 14th in the AP Top 25 poll with 811 points. On February 22, 2000, Iowa State received 229 points in the USA Today/ESPN Top 25 coaches poll which had them ranked 18th. They also were ranked 17th in the AP Top 25 poll with 662 points. On February 29, 2000, Iowa State received 353 points in the USA Today/ESPN Top 25 coaches poll which had them ranked 14th. They also were ranked 10th in the AP Top 25 poll with 1,045 points. The time of the March 4, 2000 Baylor game was changed from 7:00 p.m. CST to 6:00 p.m. CST. On March 4, 2000, Iowa State clinched their first conference title since 1945 with a 75–54 win over Baylor.
On March 7, 2000, Iowa State received 478 points in the USA Today/ESPN Top 25 coaches poll which had them ranked 9th. They also were ranked 7th in the AP Top 25 poll with 1,272 points.
On March 14, 2000, Iowa State was ranked 6th in the AP Top 25 poll with 1,441 points.

Post-season
Jamaal Tinsley and Marcus Fizer were each named to the Midwest Region All-Tournament team. Head coach Larry Eustachy was also named the Big 12 Coach of the Year and the AP National Coach of the Year. Eustachy also received the Henry Iba Award. Marcus Fizer was named an All-American. Fizer and Tinsley were also named to the Big 12 First Team. Fizer and Tinsley also won the Ralph A. Olsen Award. On March 13, 2000, Iowa State announced that head coach Larry Eustachy had signed a 10-year contract extension. On March 30, 2000, Jamaal Tinsley announced he had elected to stay at Iowa State for his senior season. On March 31, 2000, Larry Eustachy was voted the AP National Coach of the Year. On April 4, 2000, Iowa State received 657 points in the final USA Today/ESPN Top 25 coaches poll which had them ranked 3rd. On April 13, 2000, Larry Eustachy and Marcus Fizer announced that Fizer would forgo his senior season and has signed with an agent.

Roster

Statistics
Minutes: Michael Nurse 1305
MPG: Michael Nurse 35.3
Points: Marcus Fizer 844
PPG: Marcus Fizer 22.8
Rebounds: Marcus Fizer 285
RPG: Marcus Fizer 7.7
Field Goals: Marcus Fizer 327
FG%: Stevie Johnson .663
3FG: Michael Nurse 99
3FG%: Michael Nurse .423
Assists: Jamaal Tinsley 244
APG: Jamaal Tinsley 6.6
Blocks: Marcus Fizer 39
BPG: Marcus Fizer 1.1
Steals: Jamaal Tinsley 67
SPG: Jamaal Tinsley 2.6
Free Throws: Marcus Fizer 175
FT%: Kantrail Horton .780

Player stats
Note: GP= Games played; MPG= Minutes per Game; SPG= Steals per Game; RPG = Rebounds per Game; APG. = Assists per Game; BPG = Blocks per Game; PPG = Points per Game

Schedule and results

|-
!colspan=12 style=""|Regular Season

|-
!colspan=12 style=""|Regular Season

|-

|-

|-

|-

|-

|-

|-

|-

|-

|-

|-

|-

|-

|-

|-

|-

|-

|-

|-

|-

|-

|-

|-

|-

|-

|-

|-

|-

|-

|-
!colspan=12 style=""|Big 12 Tournament

|-

|-

|-
!colspan=12 style=""|NCAA tournament

|-

|-

|-

|-

Rankings

The Cyclones finished the season ranked 3rd in the Coaches Poll, this is the highest final ranking in school history.

Awards and honors

 Consensus First Team All-American

Marcus Fizer

 Big 12 Player of the Year

Marcus Fizer

 Big 12 Newcomer of the Year

Jamaal Tinsley

 Big 12 Coach of the Year

Larry Eustachy

 All-Big 12 Team

Marcus Fizer (First Team)
Jamaal Tinsley (Second Team)
Michael Nurse (Honorable Mention)

 Big 12 All-Defense Team

Jamaal Tinsley

 Big 12 All-Newcomer Team

Jamaal Tinsley

 NCAA Midwest Region All-Tournament Team

Marcus Fizer 
Jamaal Tinsley

 Big 12 All-Tournament Team

Marcus Fizer (Most Outstanding Player)
Jamaal Tinsley 
Michael Nurse

 Big 12 Player of the Week

Marcus Fizer (December 7th)
Marcus Fizer (February 14th)
Marcus Fizer (February 28th)
Marcus Fizer (March 5th)

 Big 12 Rookie of the Week

Jamaal Tinsley (January 10th)

 Pete Newell Big Man Award

Marcus Fizer

 AP Coach of the Year

Larry Eustachy

 Henry Iba Award

Larry Eustachy

 National Newcomer of the Year

Jamaal Tinsley

 Academic All-Big 12

Paul Shirley

 Ralph A. Olsen Award

Marcus Fizer

References

Iowa State Cyclones men's basketball seasons
Iowa State
Iowa State
Iowa State Cyc
Iowa State Cyc